Robert Sharp may refer to:

 Robert P. Sharp (1911–2004), expert on the geological surfaces of the Earth and the planet Mars
 Robert Sharp (crater), a crater on the planet Mars
 Robert Sharp (cricketer) (1893–1961), English cricketer
 Robert Cameron Sharp (born 1958), Scottish sprinter
 Robert "Bob" D. Sharp, 7th Director of the National Geospatial Intelligence Agency
 Robert Sharp (born 1988), pro wrestler better known as Bobby Sharp

See also
Robert Sharpe (born 1945), Canadian lawyer, author, academic, and judge
Bob Sharpe (1925–2014), Scottish footballer 
Bob Sharpe (basketball) (born 1951), Canadian basketball player
Pepper Sharpe (Robert Ernest Sharpe, 1918–1997), American baseball player